This is the discography documenting the albums and singles released by Martika and the Oppera band in which she sings.

Albums

Studio albums

As Oppera

Compilation albums

Extended plays

Singles

References

Discographies of American artists
Pop music discographies